Estradiol valerate/prasterone enanthate (EV/DHEA-E), sold under the brand name Gynodian Depot among others, is an injectable combination medication of estradiol valerate (EV), an estrogen, and prasterone enanthate (-E), an androgen, estrogen, and neurosteroid, which is used in menopausal hormone therapy for women. It is provided in the form of 1 mL ampoules containing 4 mg estradiol valerate and 200 mg prasterone enanthate in an oil solution and is administered by intramuscular injection once every 4 to 6 weeks. EV/DHEA-E reportedly has a duration of about 21 days.

The medication is available in Europe, Latin America, and Egypt. EV/DHEA-E was developed and marketed by Schering, was first described in the literature in 1972, and was introduced for medical use in April 1975.

See also
 List of combined sex-hormonal preparations

References

Combined estrogen–androgen formulations